Nicola Drocco (born 6 February 1979 in Turin) is an Italian skeleton racer who has competed since 2003. He qualified for the 2010 Winter Olympics where he finished 26th.

Drocco's best career finish was seventh at Cesana Pariol in 2007.

External links
 
 
 

1979 births
Italian male skeleton racers
Living people
Olympic skeleton racers of Italy
Skeleton racers at the 2010 Winter Olympics
21st-century Italian people